União Futebol Clube, more commonly referred to as União Mogi, is a Brazilian football club based in Mogi das Cruzes, São Paulo. The team compete in Campeonato Paulista Segunda Divisão, the fourth tier of the São Paulo state football league.

The club was formerly known as União Mogi das Cruzes Futebol Clube.

History
União Futebol Clube was founded on September 7, 1913, professionalizing its football department in 1951. The club was renamed to União Mogi das Cruzes Futebol Clube in 1998, eventually being renamed back to União Futebol Clube. União Mogi won the Campeonato Paulista Segunda Divisão in 2006.

Achievements

 Campeonato Paulista Segunda Divisão:
 Winners (1): 2006

Stadium
União Futebol Clube play their home games at Estádio Municipal Francisco Ribeiro Nogueira, nicknamed Nogueirão. The stadium has a maximum capacity of 14,384 people.

References

Association football clubs established in 1913
Football clubs in São Paulo (state)
1913 establishments in Brazil
Mogi das Cruzes